Thomas Edie Hill was an American author who produced a number of reference books for the average person, which contained various facts and figures grouped around a common theme. Born in rural Bennington, Vermont, Hill became a teacher and offered classes in penmanship and business forms. The village of Glen Ellyn, Illinois, Hill being its then-president, took its name from Lake Glen Ellyn in 1889, named after his second wife, Ellen Whitcomb.

His book Hill's Manual of Social and Business Forms is a seminal example of his work, having being printed repeatedly through multiple versions between 1880 and 1906, and contained such topics as penmanship and forms of written correspondence.

Bibliography

External links
Thomas E. Hill at OpenLibrary
Thomas E. Hill at Archive.org
Thomas E. Hill at WorldCat.org

Notes

American writers
1832 births
1915 deaths